Alberto Cárdenas Jiménez assumed office as Governor of the State of Jalisco on 1 March 1995, and his term ended on 28 February 2001. The governor has the authority to nominate members of his Cabinet of the State of Jalisco, as per the Ley Orgánica del Poder Ejecutivo del Estado de Jalisco, Article 4, Section V.

Cabinet

References 

State governments of Mexico
Cabinets established in 1995
Cabinets disestablished in 2001